Tommy John surgery (TJS), known in medical practice as ulnar collateral ligament (UCL) reconstruction, is a surgical graft procedure in which the ulnar collateral ligament in the medial elbow is replaced with either a tendon from elsewhere from the patient's own body, or the use of a tendon from the donated tissue from a cadaver. The procedure is common among collegiate and professional athletes in several sports, most notably baseball.

The procedure was first performed in 1974 by orthopedic surgeon Dr. Frank Jobe, then a Los Angeles Dodgers team physician. The surgery is named after Tommy John, the first recipient of the surgery. John won 288 games in his career–124 before the surgery and 164 after. Many players have subsequently undergone the surgery, some more than once.

List

 Denotes a player that underwent the surgery on his non-throwing arm.

References

Lists of baseball players
Lists of people by medical condition